Senator Hawley may refer to:

Charles Hawley (1792–1866), Connecticut State Senate
Joseph Roswell Hawley (1826–1905), U.S. Senator from Connecticut from 1881 to 1905
Josh Hawley (born 1979), U.S. Senator from Missouri since 2019

See also
Senator Haley (disambiguation)